Donegal West was a parliamentary constituency represented in Dáil Éireann, the lower house of the Irish parliament or Oireachtas from 1937 to 1961. The constituency elected 3 deputies (Teachtaí Dála, commonly known as TDs) to the Dáil, on the system of proportional representation by means of the single transferable vote (PR-STV).

History 
The constituency was created under the Electoral (Revision of Constituencies) Act 1935, for the 1937 general election to Dáil Éireann. It succeeded the constituency of Donegal. It was abolished under the Electoral (Amendment) Act 1961, when it and Donegal East were replaced by the new constituencies of Donegal North-East and Donegal South-West.

Boundaries 
It consisted of the district electoral divisions of:
Annagry, Aran, Ardara, Ballintra (Ballyshannon), Ballintra, (Donegal), Ballyshannon Rural, Ballyshannon Urban, Binbane, Bonnyglen, Bundoran Rural, Carrickboy, Cavangarden, Cliff, Clogher, Corkermore, Cross Roads, Crovehy, Crowkeeragh, Crowarad, Dawros, Donegal, Doocharry, Dunfanaghy, Dungloe, Dunkineely, Dunlewy, Eanymore, Fintown, Glencolmcille, Glengesh, Glenleheen, Glenties, Gortahork, Graffy, Grousehall, Haugh, Inishkeel, Inver, Kilcar, Kilgoly, Killybegs, Laghey, Largymore, Lettermacward, Lough Eask, Maas, Magheraclogher, Maghery, Malin Beg, Meenaclady, Mountcharles, Mulmosog, Pettigo, Rutland, Tawnawully, Templecarn, Tieveskeelta, and Tullynaught,

and the Urban District of Bundoran in the administrative county of Donegal.

TDs

Elections

1957 general election

1954 general election

1951 general election

1949 by-election 
Following the death of Fianna Fáil TD Brian Brady, a by-election was held on 16 November 1949. The seat was won by the Fine Gael candidate Patrick O'Donnell.

1948 general election

1944 general election

1943 general election

1938 general election

1937 general election

See also 
Dáil constituencies
Politics of the Republic of Ireland
Historic Dáil constituencies
Elections in the Republic of Ireland

References

External links 
Oireachtas Members Database

Historic constituencies in County Donegal
Dáil constituencies in the Republic of Ireland (historic)
1937 establishments in Ireland
1961 disestablishments in Ireland
Constituencies established in 1937
Constituencies disestablished in 1961